Mohammad Syafiq Bin Mohd Kamal (born 1 August 1996 in Kota Bahru), also known as Mohammad Syafiq Kamal or Mohd Syafiq Kamal, is a Malaysian professional squash player. As of February 2018, he was ranked number 84 in the world.

References

External links 
 Mohd Syafiq Bin Mohd Kamal at SRAM
 
 
 

1996 births
Living people
Malaysian male squash players
Southeast Asian Games medalists in squash
Southeast Asian Games gold medalists for Malaysia
Asian Games medalists in squash
Squash players at the 2018 Asian Games
Asian Games gold medalists for Malaysia
Medalists at the 2018 Asian Games
Competitors at the 2015 Southeast Asian Games
21st-century Malaysian people